Stichorkis is a genus of orchids native to the Indian subcontinent, Southeast Asia, New Guinea, and various islands of the Pacific and Indian Oceans.

Species
Dozens of names have been proposed for members of the genus, but at present (June 2014), only the following are recognized:

Stichorkis compressa (Blume) J.J.Wood - Borneo, Java, Sumatra, Sulawesi, Malaysia, Philippines, Vietnam 
Stichorkis disticha (Thouars) Pfitzer in H.G.A.Engler & K.A.E.Prantl  - Mauritius, Réunion, Comoros
Stichorkis endertii (J.J.Sm.) J.J.Wood - Sabah
Stichorkis gibbosa (Finet) J.J.Wood - India, Sri Lanka, Myanmar, Laos, Vietnam, Thailand, Malaysia, Indonesia, New Guinea, Solomons, Fiji, New Caledonia, Samoa, Vanuatu 
Stichorkis lingulata (Ames & C.Schweinf.) J.J.Wood - Sabah
Stichorkis lobongensis (Ames) J.J.Wood - Sabah, Sarawak
Stichorkis mucronata (Blume) J.J.Wood - Indonesia
Stichorkis pandurata (Ames) J.J.Wood  - Sabah, Sarawak

References

External links

Malaxideae genera
Malaxidinae